Pedro Iván Almasana (born 2 October 1993) is an Argentine professional footballer who plays as a defender or midfielder.

Career
Almasana started his career with Gimnasia y Esgrima. He made his professional bow during a goalless draw away to Juventud Unida on 22 February 2015, while his first start arrived in April against Unión Mar del Plata. Almasana participated in six overall matches in the 2015 Primera B Nacional campaign. June 2016 saw Almasana leave on loan, signing for Altos Hornos Zapla of Torneo Federal A. Fourteen appearances followed in tier three, along with a sole appearance in the Copa Argentina over Gimnasia y Tiro.

Career statistics
.

References

External links

1993 births
Living people
Sportspeople from Jujuy Province
Argentine footballers
Association football defenders
Association football midfielders
Primera Nacional players
Torneo Federal A players
Gimnasia y Esgrima de Jujuy footballers
Altos Hornos Zapla players